"Simple As That/Over the Rainbow" is the second single by melody. under the Toy's Factory label released June 18, 2003. The single stayed on the Oricon for 5 weeks and peaked at number 19. To date, the single has sold 14,608 copies.

Track listing
 Simple As That (4:20)
 Over the Rainbow (3:14)
 Simple As That: BL Remix (3:30)

Melody (Japanese singer) songs